"Kuttandan Punchayile" is a boat race vanchipattu popular in Kerala.
The lyrics of the song are from the 1967 film Kavalam Chundan.

References

Indian folk songs